Jamestown is a borough in northwestern Mercer County, Pennsylvania, United States, along the Shenango River. The population was reported as 580 on the 2020 census. It is part of the Youngstown–Warren metropolitan area.

History
The town was founded in 1798 by James Campbell.  The borough was incorporated in 1853.

The Jamestown area is served by the Jamestown Area School District, and is home to Combined Systems, Inc., a tactical weapons producer that exports tear gas and smoke grenades.

The Gibson House was added to the National Register of Historic Places in 1978.

The 215 Restaurant has become one of the more known places to dine bringing a different flair to the area that most would have to travel further for. 

Pymatuning Deer Park has become quite the tourist attraction bringing a zoo like experience with a small petting zoo and interactive bird cage. 

Jamestown Coating Technologies employs a large amount of locals and distributes high quality paints, powder coats and more throughout the world.

Geography
Jamestown is located at  (41.486417, −80.438354).

Climate

Demographics
As of the census of 2000, there were 636 people, 269 households, and 171 families residing in the borough. The population density was 819.5 people per square mile (314.8/km2). There were 297 housing units at an average density of 382.7 per square mile (147.0/km2). The racial makeup of the borough was 99.53% White, and 0.47% from two or more races.

There were 269 households, out of which 26.8% had children under the age of 18 living with them, 50.9% were married couples living together, 9.7% had a female householder with no husband present, and 36.1% were non-families. 29.7% of all households were made up of individuals, and 15.6% had someone living alone who was 65 years of age or older. The average household size was 2.36 and the average family size was 2.97.

In the borough the population was spread out, with 24.8% under the age of 18, 8.2% from 18 to 24, 27.2% from 25 to 44, 24.7% from 45 to 64, and 15.1% who were 65 years of age or older. The median age was 38 years. For every 100 females there were 87.1 males. For every 100 females age 18 and over, there were 85.3 males.

The median income for a household in the borough was $26,979, and the median income for a family was $40,000. Males had a median income of $31,875 versus $17,917 for females. The per capita income for the borough was $15,199. About 11.6% of families and 15.8% of the population were below the poverty line, including 20.3% of those under age 18 and 3.4% of those age 65 or over.

See also

 List of towns and boroughs in Pennsylvania

References

External links

 

Populated places established in 1798
Boroughs in Mercer County, Pennsylvania